Amid is an alternate name of Diyarbakır, a city in Turkey.

Amid may also refer to:

 Amid, West Azerbaijan, Iran
 ʿamīd, a title of rank
 Hasan Amid (1910–1979), Iranian lexicographer
 Maryam Amid (c. 1882–1919), Iranian journalist

See also
 Ibn al-'Amid (disambiguation)